Cecil Kirton (9 March 1923 – 24 November 1997) was a South African cricketer. He played in sixteen first-class matches from 1950/51 to 1954/55.

References

External links
 

1923 births
1997 deaths
South African cricketers
Border cricketers
Northerns cricketers
Sportspeople from Qonce